An Old Love is an East German black-and-white film, directed by Frank Beyer. It was released in 1959.

Plot
Frieda Walkowiak is an ambitious director of a collective farm. Although she is talented and hard-working, the men in the commune are reluctant to accept her as their supervisor. August, Frieda's husband, is exasperated by his wife's devotion to her office, which leads to her being absent from home quite often. After she misses their wedding's anniversary, August is enraged, and leaves their house with their daughter. Frieda is badly depressed and suffers a breakdown. She is taken to a hospital. August hears of this, comes back to his senses and returns. The family reunites.

Cast
 Gisela May as Frieda Walkowiak
 Erich Franz as August Walkowiak
 Doris Abeßer as Helga
 Ezard Haußmann as Lothar
 Peter Sturm as Heinrich Rantsch
 Hans-Peter Minetti as Benno Schulze
 Margot Ebert as Irmgard Strömer
 Harry Gillman as Otto Funke
 Werner Lierck as Räupke
 Rudolf Ulrich as Georg
 Günther Simon as first secretary of the party branch
 J.P. Dornseif as Uhland
 Jochen Thomas as Christopher Schwannecke
 Hans Finohr as old Schwannecke
 Peter Kalisch  as Besecke

Production
The film was made in accordance with the demands set forth by the East German establishment in the Cultural Conference of October 1957 and in the 2nd Cinema Conference of July 1958. Both called on filmmakers to concentrate on the theme of collectivization in agriculture, on the background of the ongoing campaign to establish the communal farms. It was Frank Beyer's second film.

Reception
PROGRESS-Film Verleih, the distributor of An Old Love, promoted the picture as "one that should be viewed in every village."

The West German Catholic Film Service defined the film as a "well-played film... but completely devoted to its political aim." Anke Pinkert noted that An Old Love made a subtle reference to the subjects of post-war displacement and to the bombings during World War II, that were both very controversial at the time. Joshua Feinstein cited it as one of the earliest East German pictures that had a female protagonist. Thomas Koebner wrote that the film was clearly a "vehicle of propaganda to promote the collectivization". Beyer himself told that it was "not very good."

At 1960, after the last independent farmers became members of the collectives, the film was removed from circulation.

References

External links
 
 Eine alte Liebe on filmportal.de.
 Eine alte Liebe on PROGRESS' site.

1959 films
East German films
1950s German-language films
German black-and-white films
Films directed by Frank Beyer